Soul Fighter is a 3D beat 'em up video game developed by Toka and published by TLC Multimedia for the Sega Dreamcast in 1999.

Gameplay
The gameplay centers around martial art styles of combat and using a small selection of weapons.

Plot
An evil spell of Queen Antea has fallen on the Kingdom of Gomar. As a mysterious mist envelops the kingdom, the inhabitants turn into vicious creatures. A fearless warrior (Atlus), a female spy (Sayomi), and a powerful wizard (Orion) have escaped the fate of their fellow villagers. They must now search for and capture souls in order to reverse the curse.

Development
Soul Fighter was developed by the French company Toka with help from upstart company Piggyback Interactive. The 15-person team at Toka created the game using the 3dfx Interactive Glide API for PC hardware in the same fashion as Midway Games' San Francisco Rush, NFL Blitz, and NBA Showtime. Although Soul Fighter cannot be run with Glide on the Dreamcast, the software allowed Toka to port the game from the PC to console in less than three weeks.

Production on Soul Fighter was originally set to be finished in July 1999 with the game slated for release at the North American launch of the Dreamcast. A delay set its release back to an October ship date. After settling on a publisher in Mindscape, Soul Fighter was delayed again from an October 1999 release to the following month. Piggyback consulted with a Japanese publisher at one point to transform Soul Fighter into an arcade game; the company had also considered a version for the PlayStation 2. A planned port of the game for the GameCube was announced but eventually cancelled.

Reception 

Soul Fighter received unfavorable reviews according to the review aggregation website GameRankings. Blake Fischer of NextGen called it the first spinning-world simulator to run at a 60fps.

References

External links
 

1999 video games
Beat 'em ups
Cancelled GameCube games
Dreamcast games
Dreamcast-only games
The Learning Company games
Mindscape games
Red Orb Entertainment games
Single-player video games
Video games developed in France
Video games featuring female protagonists
Toka (company) games